Uttara Bank Limited is one of the largest and oldest private sector commercial banks in Bangladesh. There are 243 branches at home and 600 affiliates worldwide.  Azharul Islam, chairman of Aftab Group, is the chairman of Uttara Bank Limited.

History
Uttara Bank Limited (UBL) was established in 1965 with the head office located at Motijheel in Dhaka, East Pakistan as a scheduled bank of the Eastern Banking Corporation.  After the Independence of Bangladesh following the Bangladesh Liberation War, the bank was nationalized under Bangladesh Banks (Nationalisation) Order 1972 and renamed it Uttara Bank. 

On 15 September 1983, Uttara Bank became a private limited bank. It is listed on Chittagong Stock Exchange and Dhaka Stock Exchange.

On 23 December 2003, Md Mahfuzus Subhan, a retired cadre of East Pakistan Civil Service, was appointed chairman of Uttara Bank Limited.

In April 2007, Uttara Bank Limited was part of a syndicate led by Dhaka Bank and composed of Premier Bank Limited and AB Bank to provide a 680 million BDT loan to Capital Board Mills Limited, a subsidiary of Capital Paper and Pulp Industries Limited.

In 2008, following instructions of Bangladesh Securities and Exchange Commission Uttara Bank Limited appointed independent directors.

Two bank officials including a branch manager and two businessmen were sentenced to life imprisonment for embezzlement of 40 million BDT in April 2016. On 10 May, Mohammed Rabiul Hossain was appointed CEO and managing director of Uttara Bank Limited.

In 2019, Uttara Bank Limited provided a 7 per cent cash dividend and 23 per cent stock dividend.

Uttara Bank Limited saw profits decline 26 per cent from July to September 2022. Iftekharul Islam, managing director of Aftab Group, was elected vice-chairman of Uttara Bank Limited. The bank opened it's 244th branch at Teknaf, Coxʹs Bazar District.

Structure
Uttara Bank Limited has 243 branches and 17 sub-branches in Bangladesh. The bank's internal and external operational activities is operated by twelve zones in different regions of the country. It operates through a number of online branches and authorised dealer branches. It is also affiliated with nearly 600 financial institutions worldwide. The Board of Directors consists of  15 members. The Head Office is located at Bank's own 18-storied building at  90, Motijheel C/A, the commercial center of the capital, Dhaka.

Despite the recent crisis in the Bangladeshi banking sector, Uttara Bank is maintaining a decent financial health. Bonik Barta, a financial daily newspaper has declared this bank as one of the strongest banks of Bangladesh based on seven indices.

References

External links

 

Banks established in 1965
Banks of Bangladesh
Companies listed on the Dhaka Stock Exchange